Lord of Dorchester or Lord Dorchester may refer to:

Titles 
 Lord Sheriff of Dorchester, aka Lord High Sheriff of Dorset
 Lord Lieutenant of Dorchester, aka Lord Lieutenant of Dorsetshire
 Baron Dorchester 
 Baroness Dorchester
 Viscount Dorchester
 Countess of Dorchester
 Earl of Dorchester
 Marquess of Dorchester

Organizations 
 Lord Dorchester Secondary School, Dorchester, Ontario, Canada

See also
 The Duke of Dorchester, professional wrestler
 Dorchester (disambiguation)